Carrig may refer to:

Carrig, County Tipperary, a settlement and electoral district in the historical Barony of Ormond Lower, North Tipperary, Ireland
 Carrig, a band of Paul Brennan

It is an Irish word meaning ‘rock’ and it is sometimes Anglicised as carrick.

People with the surname
Kacey Carrig (born 1992), American model
John Carrig (born 1952), former chief operating officer and president for ConocoPhillips